Charles King Pullin (1838–1894) was a cricket Test match umpire.  He stood in 10 tests between 1884 and 1893.  He died in Bristol.

References

1838 births
English Test cricket umpires
1894 deaths